The Diocese of Rostov and Novocherkassk is an eparchy of the Russian Orthodox Church. It is a part of the Don Archdiocese, founded in 2011 and consists of various parishes and monasteries in Southwestern Rostov Oblast.

History
Although the Diocese's roots extend to the 13th century with the formation of the Ramsar eparchy, its official history began on April 5, 1829, when Emperor Nicholas I established the "Don and the Caucasus" eparchy. The territory of this new eparchy included the Black Sea and the Caucasus region. Its bishops were granted the titles of Novocherkassk and St. George. In 1842, with the establishment of a separate Diocese of the Caucasus, the bishops at Novocherkassk received the titles of Don and Novocherkassk.

Clergy proposed the creation of a Rostov and Taganrog district as an independent department in the center of Rostov-on-Don. In response to this proposal, the Ekaterinoslavskogo-Don Bishopric clergy sent a petition to the Holy Synod to "open Vikariystvo at Don arch-priest." The Synod did not approve this application.

During the Russian Civil War, the Stavropol Council (convened May 19–24, 1919), called for the temporary administration of Orthodox sites located in territory occupied by General Denikin's troops. On May 24, the council established the Diocese of Rostov and Taganrog, per approval of the Provisional Supreme Church Authority of Southeast Russia. This diocese was separated from the Katerynoslavs'ka diocese.

In the early 1920s, after the establishment of the Don Diocese, Soviet authorities began a systematic crackdown on the Orthodox Church. A commission was established to enforce the Decree "On the separation of church and state and school and church." This group's activities focused on closing holy sites. By 1923, seven churches were closed in Rostov alone.

In the 1930s mass church closures continued, as well as the destruction and desecration of places of worship. In 1937, Rostov Cathedral was closed. It reopened during the Nazi occupation of 1942, and remains active. The Rostov Diocese resumed full operations in 1943. It then included the territory of the former Don Diocese.

On July 27, 2011 the Diocese of Rostov, Shakhty and Volgodonsk was formed. On October 6, 2011, the Diocese was incorporated into the newly formed Don Metropolis.

See also 

 Russian Orthodox Church
 Eparchies and Metropolitanates of the Russian Orthodox Church

References 

Rostov and Novocherkassk
Culture of Rostov Oblast